Underdog is an album by the Atlanta Rhythm Section, released in 1979 by Polydor Records. It is their first album with the drummer Roy Yeager since the former drummer Robert Nix left the band near the end of 1978. The album reached number 26 on the U.S. Billboard 200 albums chart, and was certified gold by the RIAA in June 1979. 
The album contained two songs which reached the top 20 of the Billboard Hot 100 singles chart, "Do It or Die" and "Spooky". 
The latter was a re-recording of the 1968 number three hit for Classics IV, a pop rock group whose line up included members who later joined Atlanta Rhythm Section.

Track listing

Personnel
Buddy Buie - vocals, backing vocals
Ronnie Hammond - vocals
Barry Bailey - acoustic and electric guitar
James B. Cobb, Jr. - guitar, percussion, backing vocals 
Paul Goddard - bass guitar, double bass
Roy Yeager - drums, percussion
Robert Nix - drums, backing vocals
Dean Daughtry - keyboards
 Original LP mastering - Bob Ludwig and Rodney Mills at Masterdisk NYC

Chart performance
Album

Singles

Certifications

References

1979 albums
Atlanta Rhythm Section albums
Polydor Records albums